Events in the year 1887 in China.

Incumbents
Emperor: Guangxu Emperor  (13th year)

Events
 6 July - Establishment of the Vicariate Apostolic of Southern Shensi
 September- 1887 Yellow River flood- an estimated 1-2 million people die and up to another 2 million die in a pandemic in the following months
 1 December - Sino-Portuguese Treaty of Peking
 Census finds a population of 401,520,392

References

 
1880s in China
Years of the 19th century in China